Mihailo Petrović Alas (6 May 1868 – 8 June 1943), was a Serbian mathematician and inventor. He was also a distinguished professor at Belgrade University, an academic, fisherman, writer, publicist, musician, businessman, traveler and volunteer in the Balkan Wars, the First and Second World Wars. He was a student of Henri Poincaré, Paul Painlevé, Charles Hermite and Émile Picard. Petrović contributed significantly to the study of differential equations and phenomenology, founded engineering mathematics in Serbia, and invented one of the first prototypes of a hydraulic analog computer.

Biography
Petrović was born on 6 May 1868, in Belgrade, as the first child of Nikodim, a professor of theology, and Milica (née Lazarević).

He finished the First Belgrade Gymnasium in 1885, and afterwards enrolled at the natural science-mathematical section of the Faculty of Philosophy in Belgrade. At the time when he finished his studies in Serbia in 1889, several Serbian mathematicians who had acquired their doctorate degrees abroad, like Dr. Dimitrije Nešić (at Vienna and Karlsruhe Institute of Technology), Dr. Dimitrije Danić (at Jena, 1885) and Bogdan Gavrilović (at Budapest, 1887) were beginning to make a name for themselves. Subsequently, in September 1889, he too went abroad, to Paris to receive further education, and to prepare for the entrance exam to the École Normale Supérieure. He got a degree in mathematical sciences from Sorbonne University in 1891. He worked on preparing his doctoral dissertation, and on 21 June 1894 he defended his PhD degree at the Sorbonne, and received a title Docteur des sciences mathematiques (doctor of mathematical sciences). His doctorate was in the field of differential equations.

In 1894, Petrović became a professor of mathematics at the Belgrade's Grande école (which later became the University of Belgrade). In those days, he was one of the greatest experts for differential equations. He held lectures until his retirement in 1938. In 1897, he became an associate member of the Serbian Royal Academy and associate member of the Yugoslav Academy of Sciences and Arts in Zagreb. He became a full member of the Serbian Royal Academy in 1899, when he was only 31.

In 1882, he became a fisherman apprentice, and in 1895 he took an exam to become a master fisherman. Mihailo Petrović got the nickname "Alas" (river fisher) because of his passion for fishery. He was not only an aficionado, but expert as well. He participated in legislative talks regarding the fishery convention with Romania, and in talks with Austria-Hungary about the protection of the fishery on Sava, Drina and Danube rivers. Alas published expert papers and reports on the fish-fauna found in the Macedonian lakes, such as Skadar Lake and Ohrid Lake. He played violin, and in 1896, founded a musical society named Suz.

Mihailo Petrović Alas also constructed a hidrointegrator, and won the gold medal at the World Exposition in Paris 1900. When in 1905 the Grande école was transformed into the University of Belgrade Petrović was among first eight regular professors, who elected other professors. He patented a total of 10 inventions, published 300 scientific works and a number of books and journals from his sea expeditions. These expeditions included trips to Azores, Newfoundland and Labrador, Suez Canal, Madagascar, Cape Verde, Canary Islands, Greenland, Iceland, Bermuda Triangle, Caribbean and others. Petrovć also visited both the North and South poles, researched the culture of Eskimos and took part in whale hunting expeditions.

He received numerous awards and acknowledgments and was a member of several foreign science academies (Prague, Bucharest, Warsaw, Kraków) and scientific societies. In 1927, when Jovan Cvijić died, members of the Serbian academy proposed Mihailo Petrović as the new president of academy, but the authorities did not accept this proposal. Probable reason for this was the fact that Mihailo Petrović Alas was first a private tutor and mentor and later a close friend of the prince Đorđe P. Karađorđević, the king's brother, who was arrested in 1925, and held in house arrest.

In 1931, members of the academy unanimously proposed Alas for the president of the academy, but authorities again dismissed this proposal. Mathematician and physicist Bogdan Gavrilović, a fellow professor, was nominated instead. In 1939, he became an honorary doctor at the University of Belgrade. In the same year, he received the order of Saint Sava, first class. He also founded the Belgrade School of Mathematics, which produced a number of mathematicians who continued Alas's work. All doctoral dissertations defended on the Belgrade University since 1912 until the Second World War were under his mentorship.

Alas participated in the Balkan Wars and in the First World War as an officer, and after the war he served as a reserve officer. He practised cryptography, and his cipher systems were used by the Yugoslav army until World War II. When the Second World War broke out in Yugoslavia, he was again called into the army and the Germans captured him. After a while, he was released because of illness. On 8 June 1943, professor Petrović died in his home in Kosančićev Venac Street in Belgrade.

Ninth Belgrade Gymnasium "Mihailo Petrović Alas" and Primary School in John's Street is a high school in Belgrade, Serbia named after him. Alas and fellow scientist Milutin Milanković were close friends for several decades.

Awards and memberships

Member of Serbian academy of sciences and arts
Member of Yugoslav academy 
Member of Academy of Sciences of the Czech Republic
Member of academy, Bucharest
Member of academy, Warsaw
Member of academy, Kraków
Member of various societies, Prague
Member of various societies in Paris
Member of various societies in Berlin
Member of various societies in France
Member of society of Italian mathematicians, Palermo
Member of society of German mathematicians, Leipzig
Member of Shevchenko Scientific Society, Lviv
Member of scientific expedition for explorationof the South Pole
Member of Rotary Club, Belgrade
Order of Miloš the Great
Order of St. Sava, 1st degree
Order of St. Sava, 2nd degree
Order of St. Sava, 3rd degree
Order of the Romanian crown, 3rd degree
Honorary brevet from London's society of mathematicians
Honorary president of Yugoslav Alliance of students of mathematics
Honorary doctor of science, University of Belgrade
Dean of Faculty of Philosophy, Belgrade

Selected works

O asimptonim vrednostima integrala i deferencijalnih jednačina, Beograd, 1895.
Elementi matematicke fenomenologije, Beograd 1911.
Les spectres numeriques, Paris 1919.
Mecanismes communs aux phenomenes disparates, Paris 1921,
Notice sur les travaux scientifiques de M. Michel Petrovich, Paris, 1922
Durees physiques independantes des dimensions spatiales, Zurich-Paris, 1924.
Lecons sur les spectres mathematiques, Paris, 1928.
Integrales premieres a restrictions, Paris, 1929.
Integrales qualitative des equations differentielles, Paris, 1931.
Fenomenološko preslikavanje, Beograd, 1933.
Jedan diferencijalni algoritam i njegove primene, Beograd, 1936.
Članci, Beograd, 1949.
Metafore i alegorije, Beograd 1967.
Računanje sa brojnim razmacima, Beograd, 1932.
Eliptičke funkcije, Beograd, 1937.
Integracije diferencijalnih jednačina pomoću redova, Beograd 1938.
Kroz polarnu oblast, Beograd 1932.
U carstvu gusara, Beograd, 1933.
Sa okeanskim ribarima, Beograd, 1935.
Po zabačenim ostrvima, Beograd, 1936.
Roman jegulje, Beograd, 1940.
Đerdapski ribolov u prošlosti i sadašnjosti, Beograd, 1941.
Daleka kopna i mora, Beograd, 1948.
Po gusarima i drugim ostrvima, Beograd 1952.
S okenaskim ribarima, Subotica, 1953.
Po gusarskim ostrvima, Beograd, 1960.
Sa Arktika do Antarktika, Beograd, 1960.

Edition of the complete works:

Book 1: Diferencijalne jednacine I
Book 2: Diferencijalne jednacine II
Book 3: Matematička analiza
Book 4: Algebra
Book 5: Matematički spektri
Book 6: Matematička fenomenologija
Book 7: Elementi matematičke fenomenologije
Book 8: Intervalna matematika – diferencijalni algoritam
Book 9: Eliptičke funkcije – integracija pomoću redova
Book 10: Članci – studije
Book 11: Putopisi I
Book 12: Putopisi II
Book 13: Metafore i alegorije – članci
Book 14: Ribarstvo
Book 15: Mihailo Petrović (pisma, bibliografija i letopis)

See also
Mika Alas's House, where he lived, worked, and died, is a designated historic site.
 Bogdan Gavrilović
 Jovan Karamata

References

Notes

Further reading

External links 

Mihailo Petrovic
The First Century of the International Commission on Mathematical Instruction, Petrovic
Brilliant mind of mathematician, globetrotter and fisherman – Mihajlo Petrovich Alas
 Mihailo Petrović Alas: Life, Work, Times (2019)

1868 births
1943 deaths
People from the Principality of Serbia
Scientists from Belgrade
Serbian inventors
Serbian mathematicians
Members of the Serbian Academy of Sciences and Arts
Fishers
University of Paris alumni
Academic staff of Belgrade Higher School
École Normale Supérieure alumni
Grand Crosses of the Order of St. Sava
Burials at Belgrade New Cemetery